"Wait" is a single by English new wave band Wang Chung, released as the fourth and final single from their 1983 studio album, Points on the Curve. The single reached No. 87 on the UK Singles Chart. Aside from the early singles released as Huang Chung, "Wait" was the only single by Wang Chung that failed to chart on the US Billboard Hot 100. However, it peaked at No. 17 on the U.S. Billboard Hot Dance Club Play chart.

No music video was shot for "Wait".

"Wait" is also the only Wang Chung song to appear on two different non-compilation albums. "Wait" originally appeared on Points on the Curve (1983), but was used again on the To Live and Die in L.A. soundtrack when director William Friedkin liked the song so much, he wanted to incorporate it into his 1985 neo-noir thriller, To Live and Die in L.A. "Wait" appears during the end credits of the film.

Track listing
 "Wait" (Remix)
 "Dance Hall Days" (U.S. Club edit)
 "Dance Hall Days" (Part 2)

Charts

References

External links
 

1984 singles
Wang Chung (band) songs
Songs written by Jack Hues
Songs written by Nick Feldman
Song recordings produced by Ross Cullum
Song recordings produced by Chris Hughes (record producer)
1983 songs
Geffen Records singles